Celso Bugallo Aguiar (born 12 March 1947) is a Spanish actor. He appeared in more than forty films since 1999.

Selected filmography

References

External links 

1947 births
Living people
Spanish male film actors
20th-century Spanish male actors
21st-century Spanish male actors